Chennai Park Town, or just Park Town, is a railway station on the Chennai MRTS. Located just to the east of Pallavan Salai and to the south of the Rajiv Gandhi Government General Hospital in the Park Town neighbourhood of Chennai, it exclusively serves the Chennai MRTS. The station is adjacent to Chennai Park, which serves the Chennai Suburban Railway. It is also within walking distance to Chennai Central. Although within walking distance, a 1 km overhead pedestrian walkway is being planned to connect Chennai Central with the MRTS station.

History

The Chennai Park Town station opened on 1 November 1995, as part of the first phase of the Chennai MRTS network.

Structure

The stations is currently located at ground level, although the MRTS route begins its ascent to an elevated viaduct for much of its route.

Service and connections

Chennai Park Town station is currently the third station on the MRTS line to Velachery. From Velachery, it is fifteenth station towards Chennai Beach station.

The station is adjacent to the Chennai Park station, which services multiple Chennai Suburban Railway lines. Additionally, it is planned to be connected to Chennai Central and the future Chennai Central metro station, when the Chennai Metro becomes operational.

As of 2012, the station handles about 30,000 passengers a day.

See also
 Chennai MRTS
 Chennai suburban railway
 Chennai Metro
 Transport in Chennai

References

Chennai Mass Rapid Transit System stations
Railway stations in Chennai
Railway stations opened in 1995